Bhatakatiya is a small town in Achham District in the Seti Zone of western Nepal. According to the 1991 Nepal census, the village had a population of 3270 living in 580 houses. At the time of the 2001 Nepal census, the population was 3906, of which 26% was literate.

References

Populated places in Achham District
Village development committees in Achham District